Carex lobolepis is an Australian species of sedge that was first described in 1874 by Ferdinand von Mueller in his Fragmenta Phytographiae Australiae. This plant is native to moist areas of the coastal mountain ranges and the eastern edges of the tablelands in New South Wales and Queensland.

References

lobolepis
Plants described in 1874
Flora of New South Wales
Flora of Queensland